Holy Water  (later re-named Hard Times) is a 2009 Irish comedy film directed by Tom Reeve and starring John Lynch, Linda Hamilton, Cornelius Clarke and Lochlainn O'Mearain.  It tells the story of a group of men in a rural Irish village who hijack a truck containing Viagra with the intention of selling the drug in Amsterdam.

Plot
Make Mine a Stiff One

Set in Ulster, four friends living in the tiny Irish village of Killcoulin's Leap (once known for its spa and holy well) are tired of just scraping by. Soon to be laid-off, postman Podger comes up with the plan to hijack a truck carrying a load of Viagra and then unload it in Amsterdam.

Donal and Sean dress up as road workers and Podger and Thomas as nuns. Successfully commandeering the Pfizer truck, they find a transponder and throw it into a current bound for the Atlantic. The four at first believe they got away with it, however, American investigator Cory Williams (Linda Hamilton) has shown up to find the missing little blue tablets. In a panic, the friends hide the stash down the Well of the Virgin Mary, the water source for the entire town.

While the four are having their morning tea in Thomas’ hotel, both the private security company investigators and a news crew check in. The four head in search of the transponder to wipe it of prints and send it on. The investigators interrogate them shortly after they do so, but let the group go.

Sean had gone to confession, essentially broadcasting to the whole town their heist, as the priest is chatty after a drink. That night, the four are summoned to the pub. The entire parish knows and promises to keep quiet. Three months later, Killcoulin's Leap is thriving, thanks to publicity about their ‘magical waters’.

Cast
 John Lynch as Tom Gaffney
 Cornelius Clarke as	Podger Byrnes
 Lochlann Ó Mearáin as Donal O'Connell
 Cian Barry as	Sean Casey
 Susan Lynch as Geraldine Gaffney
 Deirdre Mullins as Kate Mulvey
 Linda Hamilton as	Cory Williams
 Tom Lister Jr. as SixPac Jordan
 Angeline Ball as PC Anne Mooney

References

External links
 
 
 

2009 films
Irish comedy films
2009 comedy films
English-language Irish films
2000s English-language films